Lithothelium is a genus of lichen-forming fungi in the family Pyrenulaceae. Most of the species are found in tropical climates, and are usually  corticolous (bark-dwelling) or saxicolous (rock-dwelling). The genus was circumscribed by Swiss botanist Johannes Müller Argoviensis in 1885.

Species
Lithothelium austropacificum  – Lord Howe Island
Lithothelium bermudense  – Bermuda
Lithothelium cubanum 
Lithothelium echinatum  – China
Lithothelium filisporum 
Lithothelium fluorescens 
Lithothelium fugax 
Lithothelium grossum  – China
Lithothelium hieroglyphicum  – Australia
Lithothelium hyalosporum 
Lithothelium illotum 
Lithothelium immersum 
Lithothelium insulare  – India
Lithothelium kantvilasii  – Australia
Lithothelium obtectum 
Lithothelium phaeosporum 
Lithothelium quadrisporum  – Thailand
Lithothelium quiescens  – Christmas Island

References

Pyrenulales
Lichen genera
Eurotiomycetes genera
Taxa named by Johannes Müller Argoviensis
Taxa described in 1885